The Men's 1 km time trial competition at the 2017 World Championships was held on 16 April 2017.

Results

Qualifying
The top 8 riders qualified for the final.

Final
The final was started at 14:49.

References

Men's 1 km time trial
UCI Track Cycling World Championships – Men's 1 km time trial